Wayne Odesnik (born November 21, 1985) is a South African-born American retired professional left-handed tennis player, with a two-handed backhand. His highest singles ranking	was No. 77 in 2009.

Among his biggest upsets were a 2007 win over Ivan Ljubičić, and a 2009 win against Igor Kunitsyn.

Odesnik won his first Futures title in 2003, and won a combined 14 singles titles in Challenger and Future ITF Men's Circuit events. He resides in Weston, Florida, in the United States.

In March 2010, Odesnik pleaded guilty to importing human growth hormone into Australia, and was banned for two years by the International Tennis Federation, later reduced to one year on account of his "substantial assistance" with the Federation's anti-doping program. In March 2015 he was handed a 15-year ban after a second doping violation.

Early and personal life
Odesnik and his family emigrated from South Africa to the United States when he was age 3, and he became an American citizen. His father, Harold, is a jeweler who owns a store in Aventura, just north of Miami, Florida, and his mother, Janice, is a former South African competitive gymnast who is now a computer coordinator. His grandmother, Sylvia, was a professional ice skater.

Odesnik currently resides in Florida.

Tennis career
Odesnik was introduced to tennis at age 7 by his grandmother, and his first tennis club was the Jewish Community Center in North Miami Beach, Florida.

Junior career (2000–01)
In 2000 Odesnik lost in the finals in singles at the Easter Bowl. In 2001 he won the singles title at the El Paso Youth Tennis Centre ITF Tournament, was a semifinalist in both singles and doubles (with Jarrett Chirico) at the USTA Junior International Hard Court Championships, finished in third place in singles and doubles (with Chirico) at the boys’ 16 USTA Super National Hard Court Championships, and was a boys’ 16 singles semifinalist at the USTA Super National Clay Court Championships. He also won the Curaçao Junior Open, and won the doubles title (with Chirico) and at the USTA Super National Spring Championships – The Easter Bowl.

Professional career; 2001–04
Odesnik first competed professionally in 2001, playing only one match. He didn't win anything in 2002, but did go on to win two futures events in Jamaica in 2003, winning the first over Jacob Adaktusson in the final, and the next against Juan Mónaco in the final.

2004 saw Odesnik make three Futures finals late in the season, losing at first to Horia Tecău, then making the second final and again losing to Tecău, then losing in his third final to Brendan Evans. He also participated in the 2004 U.S. Open, after receiving a wildcard entry into the main draw. He lost to David Sánchez. Odesnik reached one Futures doubles final partnering with Zack Fleishman, but lost in the final to Tecău (this time in doubles) and Alex Kuznetsov.

2005
Odesnik reached one Futures doubles final with Josh Goffi, but lost to Scott Lipsky and David Martin. In 2005 singles play, Odesnik won two finals out of five in Futures play, ending the year with a 10-match winning streak. He won two straight titles in tournaments entered, in Honolulu and Waikoloa, Hawaii. He beat Lipsky in the first final, and then beat Sam Querrey a week later on his 20th birthday. He also participated in an ATP Masters Series event, at the Indian Wells Masters, losing in the first round to Fernando Verdasco. He wound up 2005 with a 10-match winning streak and ranked 265 for singles, 1,091 for doubles.

2006
In 2006 Odesnik won three singles titles on the Futures circuit. He lost in straight sets to Raemon Sluiter at the 2005 U.S. Open. He beat Scott Oudsema, in his first title of the Futures year in Little Rock, Arkansas, as he did not drop a set in any of his matches, then Harsh Mankad in Mobile, Alabama to win a title the following week, and then won the Milan Challenger title over bronze Olympic medalist Arnaud di Pasquale in three sets in the final. On April 4, 2006, he was named USTA Circuit Player of the Week. He ended 2006 ranked 194 for singles, and 780 for doubles.

2007
In Challenger events, he reached the finals of Karlsruhe, where he lost to Mischa Zverev. He went on to make the third round of a major-level event, beating Juan Martín del Potro. He then lost to John Isner in three tiebreak sets.

At the August 2007 Rogers Masters, Odesnik had an amazing run. In qualifying he defeated Jan Hernych. He went on to the main draw of the ATP Masters Series Canada, and upset Ivan Ljubičić in three sets, before going down to Frank Dancevic.

At the 2007 U.S. Open, Odesnik beat Danai Udomchoke of Thailand 7–5 in the fifth set to reach the second round. He then lost there to eventual quarterfinalist Juan Ignacio Chela. In October in Sacramento, California, he beat Yen-Hsun Lu in the finals. Later that month in Busan, Korea, he again defeated Lu, before losing in the quarterfinals.

In December, Alex Kuznetsov, Jesse Levine, and Odesnik were invited by the USTA to play off in a round-robin for the wild-card berth in the Australian Open. Levine won the wild card, defeating Odesnik.

Odesnik was 4–3 for the year in ATP play, and 26–17 on the Challenger circuit. He ended 2007 ranked #126 for singles, and #553 for doubles.

2008
In February, at the San Jose International Series, Odesnik defeated Donald Young. In April at the International Series in Houston, Texas, he beat Dudi Sela, and Sergio Roitman. At the World Team Championship in Germany in May he beat Ivo Minář, and in doubles he and partner James Blake beat Lucas Arnold and Sebastián Prieto, and Czechs Tomáš Berdych and Pavel Vízner.

In early 2008 Odesnik was coached by Félix Mantilla Botella.

At the French Open in May, he beat Cañas 7–6, 7–6, 7–6 in a very tight three-hour and 46-minute match that got him to round 2 of the grand slam. "I was just trying not to put [Cañas] on a pedestal in my mind", said Odesnik. He then beat Hyung-Taik Lee in the next round.

At Wimbledon he arrived on court against 24th-seed Jarkko Nieminen with heavy strapping on his thigh, and succumbed to injury after losing the opening set 6–3. Odesnik underwent rehab on an injured Muscle in his left hip; a small tear in his groin that he had suffered in a tournament in Poland.

In August he beat Bobby Reynolds in Los Angeles, Sébastien Grosjean in New Haven, and at the US Open Fabio Fognini. In November Odesnik beat Diego Junqueira in Ecuador. He ended 2008 ranked #119 for singles, and #558 for doubles.

2009
In February, Odesnik won the Home Depot Center USTA Challenger in Carson, California, beating Vincent Spadea in the semifinals. Seeded fourth, Odesnik dropped only one set in five tournament matches—to fifth-seeded Jesse Levine in the quarterfinals, in a match that took over three hours.

In April at the U.S. Men's Clay Court Championships in Houston, Texas at River Oaks Country Club, Odesnik defeated third-seeded Jürgen Melzer of Austria (winning 94% of his second-serve points), beat fellow American John Isner in a 2:37 quarterfinal marathon,Mens Clay Court Championship and defeated Björn Phau in the semifinals to reach his first ATP World Tour final, in which he lost to Lleyton Hewitt. Following the tournament, he received his then-career-best world ranking of #77.

As of April 11, in 14 ATP World Tour clay-court matches he had the best winning percentage among Americans on clay; 0.714.

At the 2009 French Open Odesnik lost in three hours and 43 minutes on the main Court Philippe Chatrier to the hometown favorite Gilles Simon.

At Wimbledon Odesnik lost his first round match to 30th-ranked Jürgen Melzer. The match generated some media attention as a consequence of the patterns of pre-match betting on the result, with the online betting exchange Betfair reporting that unusually large sums for a low-profile match were wagered on the straight sets scoreline. Officials at Betfair did not suspect anything untoward, noting that an announcement had been made on TV shortly before the match that Odesnik was injured.

At the 2009 Indianapolis Tennis Championships in July, Odesnik beat fourth-seeded Igor Kunitsyn.

2010
On March 26, 2010, after having reached a world ranking of 98 in professional tennis, Odesnik pleaded guilty to importing human growth hormone (HGH) to Australia, prior to the Brisbane International, a warm-up event for the Australian Open. He was fined US$7,000, and faced a multi-year banishment from professional tennis.
 On April 19, Odesnik agreed to a voluntary suspension from the tour while awaiting a hearing by an independent tribunal, which was expected to take place around June 2010. In the meantime, Odesnik was free to return to the tour at any time.

On May 19, 2010, Odesnik was banned—initially for two years—by the International Tennis Federation, later reduced to one year on account of his "substantial assistance" with the Federation's anti-doping program, after pleading guilty to importing HGH into Australia. The suspension was dated to December 29, 2009. As part of the ban, his results since December 29 were erased, and he was required to forfeit his ranking points and prize money. Odesnik was ranked No. 114 and had earned more than $90,000 in prize money in 2010. In January 2013, it was revealed that Odesnik's name appeared in handwritten records of Biogenesis of America, a former Miami sports clinic linked to a performance-enhancing drug scandal in Major League Baseball. In records for 2009, 2010, and 2011, under the heading of 'Tennis' in five client lists, Odesnik's name appeared numerous times; the records indicated that he was billed $500 per month by the clinic.  Odesnik denied any connection to the clinic.

2011
Unranked, Odesnik received a main draw wild card for ITF Futures event U.S.A. F1, and reached the quarter-finals. The following week, again as a wild card, he retired from his second round qualifying match. As the season wore on, Odesnik picked up a pair of singles titles at Challenger events: The Savannah Challenger, where he defeated Donald Young in the final, and the Fifth Third Bank Championships, where he beat James Ward.

2012
Odesnik started the year as the sixth seed at the Seguros Bolívar Open, a Challenger event, where he won the singles title by defeating Adrian Ungur in the final. He did not drop a set during the tournament.

2015
On March 18, 2015, Odesnik was handed a 15-year ban after a second doping violation.

Style of play
Odesnik had a modest serve, an excellent forehand, an improving backhand, and good quickness. He also varied his first and second serves, hid the placement of his forehand, and played the angles on the court.

Odesnik undertook sessions with a sports psychologist in 2008. In 2009 he worked with fitness trainer Mikhail Zanko, and coached by Grant Doyle.

ATP career finals

Singles: 1 (1 runner-up)

ATP Challenger and ITF Futures finals

Singles: 29 (15–14)

Doubles: 2 (0–2)

Performance timeline

Singles

See also
List of select Jewish tennis players

References

External links
 
 
 Odesnik World ranking history

American male tennis players
American people of South African-Jewish descent
Doping cases in tennis
Jewish American sportspeople
Jewish tennis players
People from Weston, Florida
Tennis players from Johannesburg
South African emigrants to the United States
South African Jews
Tennis people from Florida
1985 births
Living people
American sportspeople in doping cases
21st-century American Jews
Sportspeople from Miami-Dade County, Florida